Angelica dahurica, commonly known as Dahurian angelica, is a wildly  grown species of angelica native to Siberia, Russia Far East, Mongolia, Northeastern China, Japan, Korea, and Taiwan. This species tend to grow near river banks, along streams and among rocky shrubs. The root of the plant is widely used for its medicinal properties and is known to contain furanocoumarins and angelicotoxin.

Angelica dahurica is also commonly known as Chinese angelica, the garden angelica, root of the Holy Ghost, and wild angelica, as well as its Chinese name, bai zhi (白芷).

Description
It is a perennial plant that grows to about 1–2 meters tall. The plant usually has a brown cylindrical root that grows approximately 2–5 cm thick. The stem is purplish-green in color, ribbed, and it usually ranges from 2–8 cm thick in diameter. First year plants  remain in a basal clump about 30 inches high, fuller in rich soil, with complex divided leaves 10-20 inches long, and reddish-purple coloring at the base. In the second or third year plant, the plant sends up a sturdy, hollow one-inch diameter stalk to 8 feet. The plant produces greenish-white flowers on umbels up to 12 inches in diameter that bloom in the summer, usually from July to August or September. The seeds of the plant follow, turning from greenish-white to medium brown and papery as they ripen from August to October. The flowers of the plant are hermaphroditic (containing both male and female reproductive organs) and are pollinated via insects. The plant also undergoes self pollination. The roots and leaves of the plant are strongly aromatic. The roots have a scent resembling that of wild Queen Annes's lace (Daucus carota), and a pungent, bitter taste.

Propagation
In an ideal climate, most species of Angelica, including the dahurican root, can thrive in moist and shady environments, at the same time where sun is accessible when necessary. It is best to plant fresh seeds of this plant once available. Once the seeds have ripened, its color brown and texture papery, they are immediately sown in a cold frame in deep, moist, fertile soil. Though the plants can grow under semi-shade or full-shaded conditions, the seeds require light for it to germinate. In addition, since this is a perennial plant, seeds are not required for its growth. A. dahurica can grow back naturally on its own, year after year. The Dahurican roots are primarily produced in China's Sichuan province, in the Suining district.

Cultivation
The Dahurican roots are harvested twice a year during the summer and autumn seasons. Its cylindrical roots must be harvested before the plant's stalk emerges. The leaves are removed, the side roots are trimmed, and the roots are thinly sliced, longitudinally. Afterwards, the sliced roots are dried under the sun. In Suining, 70% of its usage are for general purposes whereas 100% of its usage are for medicinal purposes. The roots are also harvested and cultivated in Taiwan, Japan, and Korea.

Medicinal uses
The medicinal properties of the Dahurican root has been dated back to Ancient China as early as 400 BC. Zhang Cong Zhen (1156–1228), a famous physician in the military, believed that diseases were caused by external evil factors, or pathogens, that entered the human body. He listed Bai Zhi as an herb that purge the body of any negative influences such as heat, clamminess, dryness, and cold on the skin. Today, the roots are used for other numerous treatments of illnesses such as headaches, relieving nasal obstruction, detoxification of the blood, as a pain reliever, an anti-inflammatory, a laxative, sedative, anti-fungal cream for skin, as well as treating swollen gums and toothaches.

Other uses
The stalks of this plant have also been commonly used as a food ingredient. The stems have been made into decorative items. The seeds are often used as a seasoning condiment in food as well as a source of flavoring in liqueur. Another popular usage for this herb is its ingredient in cosmetic products.

Toxicity
Aside from the medicinal properties that this plant offers, this species also contain furocoumarins which increases skin sensitivity to sunlight and may cause dermatitis. Another compound called the angelicotoxin, is an active ingredient within the root. This has an excitatory effect on the respiratory system, central nervous system, and the vasculomotor system of the body. It is known to increase the rate of respiration, blood pressure, decrease pulse rate, increases saliva production and induces vomiting. In large doses, the toxin can induce convulsions and paralysis.

References

External links
Angelica dahurica (Fisch. ex Hoffm.) Medicinal Plant Images Database (School of Chinese Medicine, Hong Kong Baptist University)  
白芷, Dahurian Angelica Root, Bai Zhi Chinese Medicine Specimen Database (School of Chinese Medicine, Hong Kong Baptist University)  

dahurica